Regina Russell Banali is an American film producer, director, television presenter, and actress. She has appeared in over 50 films and television shows.

Biography
One of her first roles as an actress was playing one of the three mermaids who save Robin Williams's character in Steven Spielberg's Hook (1991). She produced and directed a commissioned comedy short for Crackle and PSAs for the HSUS on animal welfare issues. She directed and produced a feature-length documentary called Quiet Riot – Well Now You're Here There's No Way Back about the hard rock band Quiet Riot. It premiered on the Showtime Network January 29, 2015.

Banali owned and operated Celebrity Closet Raiders, a designer resale store in West Hollywood which carried merchandise previously owned by celebrities. She has appeared in fashion segments for The Today Show, E! News, Access Hollywood, The Fashion Team, and Good Day L.A.

Banali was married to Quiet Riot drummer and manager Frankie Banali until his death on August 20, 2020.

Filmography 
QUIET RIOT: Well Now You're Here, There's No Way Back  (2014) .... Producer/Director
Matt Grant PSA for Spaying and Neutering Pets  (2008) .... Writer/Producer/Director
Dating Brad Garrett (2008) .... Herself
The Fashion Team (2007) .... Herself
The Today Show (2005) .... Herself
Visions of Passion (2003) .... Alice
Hook (1991) .... Red-headed, pink tailed mermaid

References

External links 
 
 

American film directors
American women film directors
American film actresses
Living people
American television actresses
American film producers
American television producers
American women television producers
American television hosts
Year of birth missing (living people)
American women film producers
American women television presenters
21st-century American women